Kabanovka is a rural locality in Makarovsky Selsoviet Rural Settlement, Kurchatovsky District, Kursk Oblast, Russia. Population:

Geography 
The village is located on the Tereblya River (a right tributary of the Seym), 60 km from the Russia–Ukraine border, 46.5 km west of Kursk, 11 km north-west of the district center – the town Kurchatov, 2.5 km from the selsoviet center – Makarovka.

 Climate
Kabanovka has a warm-summer humid continental climate (Dfb in the Köppen climate classification).

Transport 
Kabanovka is located 38 km from the federal route  Crimea Highway, 8.5 km from the road of regional importance  (Kursk – Lgov – Rylsk – border with Ukraine), 16 km from the road  (Lgov – Konyshyovka), 4 km from the road of intermunicipal significance  (38K-017 – Nikolayevka – Shirkovo), 2.5 km from the road  (38N-362 – Makarovka – Lgov), 9 km from the nearest railway station Lukashevka (railway line Lgov I — Kursk).

The rural locality is situated 53 km from Kursk Vostochny Airport, 139 km from Belgorod International Airport and 256 km from Voronezh Peter the Great Airport.

References

Notes

Sources

Rural localities in Kurchatovsky District, Kursk Oblast